Island council elections were held in the Netherlands Antilles on 7 May (Curaçao, Saba and Sint Eustatius) and 21 May 1999 (Sint Maarten) to elect the members of the island councils of its five island territories. The election was won by the Party for the Restructured Antilles (5 seats) in Curaçao, the Windward Islands People's Movement (4 seats) in Saba, the Sint Eustatius Alliance (3 seats) in Sint Eustatius, and the Democratic Party (7 seats) in Sint Maarten.

Results

Bonaire

Curaçao

Saba

Sint Eustatius

Sint Maarten

References

Netherlands
1999 in the Netherlands Antilles
1999 in Sint Maarten
May 1999 events in North America
Elections in the Netherlands Antilles
Elections in Bonaire
Elections in Curaçao
Elections in Saba (island)
Elections in Sint Eustatius
Elections in Sint Maarten
Election and referendum articles with incomplete results